Hemidactylus yerburii, also known commonly as the southern leaf-toed gecko, Yerbury's gecko, and Yerburi's leaf-toed gecko, is a species of lizard in the family Gekkonidae. The species is native to Western Asia.

Geographic range
H. yerburii is found on the southern Arabian Peninsula in Saudi Arabia and Yemen.

Taxonomy
Populations of H. yerburii reported from Africa are based on misidentifications (H. macropholis), or have been elevated from subspecies to full species rank, namely H. montanus and H. pauciporus.

Etymology
The specific name, yerburii, is in honor of amateur entomologist Lieutenant Colonel John William Yerbury (1847–1927), who collected the holotype.

Habitat
H. yerburii, in the sense of including African populations no longer included in this species, occurs in a wide range of habitats from rocky desert areas to well vegetated habitats, including lowland deciduous forest and shrubland, and also occurs on buildings in settlements. It is found from the sea level to  asl.

Reproduction
H. yerburii is oviparous.

Abundance 
H. yerburii is very rare; the species was described based on a single female.

References

Further reading
Anderson J (1895). "On a Collection of Reptiles and Batrachians made by Colonel Yerbury at Aden and in its Neighbourhood". Proceedings of the Zoological Society of London 1895: 635–663 + Plates XXXVI–XXXVII. (Hemidactylus yerburii, new species, p. 636, 640–641 + Plate XXXVI, figures 1, 1a, 1b, 1c, 1d, 1e).
Rösler H (2000). "Kommentierte Liste der rezent, subrezent und fossil bekannten Geckotaxa (Reptilia: Gekkonomorpha)". Gekkota 2: 28–153. ("Hemidactylus yerburyii [sic]", p. 88). (in German).
Sindaco R, Jeremčenko VK (2008). Reptiles of the Western Palearctic. 1. Annotated Checklist and Distributional Atlas of the Turtles, Crocodiles, Amphisbaenians and Lizards of Europe, North Africa, Middle East and Central Asia. (Monographs of the Societas Herpetologica Italica). Latina, Italy: Edizioni Belvedere. 580 pp. .
Sindaco R, Nincheri R, Lanza B (2014). "Catalogue of Arabian reptiles in the collections of the “La Specola” Museum, Florence". Scripta Herpetologica. Studies on Amphibians and Reptiles in honour of Benedetto Lanza 137–164. 
Šmíd J, Shobrak M, Wilms T, Joger U, Carranza S (2016). "Endemic diversification in the mountains: genetic, morphological, and geographical differentiation of the Hemidactylus geckos in southwestern Arabia". Organisms Diversity & Evolution 17: 267–285. ("Hemidactylus yerburyi [sic]").

Hemidactylus
Reptiles of the Arabian Peninsula
Reptiles described in 1895
Taxa named by John Anderson (zoologist)